Fabbrecce  is a frazione of the comune of Città di Castello in the Province of Perugia, Umbria, central Italy. It stands at an elevation of 265 metres above sea level. At the time of the Istat census of 2001, it had 303 inhabitants.

References

External links 
 Provincia di Perugia homepage  

Frazioni of Città di Castello